Fawn Wood is a Cree and Salish musician from St. Paul, Alberta, Canada. She is most noted for her album Kakike, for which she won the Juno Award for Traditional Indigenous Artist of the Year at the Juno Awards of 2022.

She is the daughter of Earl Wood, a musician with the traditional Cree group Northern Cree, and the cousin of Joel Wood, a musician who was a fellow Juno nominee in the same category in 2022.

She studied the Cree language at Blue Quills University.

References

21st-century Canadian women singers
21st-century First Nations people
Cree people
First Nations musicians
Musicians from Alberta
Living people
Year of birth missing (living people)
Juno Award for Traditional Indigenous Artist of the Year winners
First Nations women singers